Hyper-Kamiokande is a neutrino observatory being constructed on the site of the Kamioka Observatory, near Kamioka, Japan.

The project started in 2010 as a successor to Super-Kamiokande. It was ranked as among the 28 top priority projects of the Japanese government. Thirteen countries from three continents are involved in this program.

Construction was given final approval on 13 December 2019. Mass production of the photomultiplier tube detectors began in 2021. Construction of the access tunnel was completed on February 25, 2022. The beginning of data-taking is planned for 2027.

Hyper-Kamiokande will have a tank with a billion litres of ultrapure water (UPW), 20 times larger than the tank for Super-Kamiokande. This increased capacity will be accompanied by a proportional increase in the number of sensors. The tank for Hyper-Kamiokande will be a double cylinder 2 × 250 meters long, always approximately 40 × 40 meters, and buried 650 meters deep to reduce interference from cosmic radiation.

Among the scientific objectives will be the search for proton decays. Super-Kamiokande put a lower bound on the proton's half life of around 1034 years, which is enough to rule out some Grand Unified Theories (GUTs) such as SU(5); Hyper-Kamiokande will allow for a lower bound of around 1035, enabling other GUT candidates to be tested.

Bibliography

References

External links
 Official site

Neutrino observatories
Astronomical observatories in Japan